The Andorra national futsal team is controlled by the Andorran Football Federation, the governing body for futsal in Andorra and represents the country in international futsal competitions, such as the World Cup and the European Championships.

Competition history

FIFA Futsal World Cup

UEFA European Futsal Championship

Current squad

Head coach: Xavier Fernandez

References

External links

Andorra
National sports teams of Andorra
Futsal in Andorra